Ouro Verde may refer to:

 Ouro Verde, Santa Catarina, Brazil
 Ouro Verde, São Paulo, Brazil
 Ouro Verde (TV series), a Portuguese telenovela